Zardalan Rural District is a rural district (dehestan) in Holeylan County, Ilam Province, Iran. At the 2006 census, its population was 2,518, in 512 families.  The rural district has 25 villages.

References 

Rural Districts of Ilam Province
Chardavol County